Strongylognathus palaestinensis is a species of ant in the genus Strongylognathus. It is endemic to Israel.

References

Strongylognathus
Hymenoptera of Asia
Insects of the Middle East
Endemic fauna of Israel
Insects described in 1933
Taxonomy articles created by Polbot